Hardenburgh Falls is a waterfall in Delaware County, New York. It is located west of Grand Gorge along NY–23, on Bear Kill.

References

Waterfalls of New York (state)
Landforms of Delaware County, New York
Tourist attractions in Delaware County, New York